The International Symposium on Mixed and Augmented Reality (ISMAR) is the leading international academic conference in the field of augmented reality and mixed reality. The symposium is organized and supported by IEEE Computer Society and IEEE VGTC . The first ISMAR conference was held in 2002 in Darmstadt, Germany. The creation of the conference emerged from the fusion of two former academic events dedicated to this research field: the International Symposium on Augmented Reality (ISAR) and the International Symposium on Mixed Reality (ISMR) .

External links 
 IEEE ISMAR website

Computer science conferences
IEEE conferences